Nikoides danae is a species of crustacean in the family Processidae, first described in 1875 by 	
Otton Mikhailovich Paulson.

It is a bottom dwelling species found at depths of 0-5 m, in shallow waters of the Central Pacific, off New Caledonia and French Polynesia.

References

Crustaceans described in 1875
Caridea